Liu Xincheng (born ) is a Chinese male politician, who is currently the vice chairperson of the National Committee of the Chinese People's Political Consultative Conference.

References

External links 

1952 births
Living people

Chinese People's Political Consultative Conference